The David A. Boody was a fireboat operated on the North River, the lower portion of the Hudson River, within New York state.  She was built and commissioned in 1892 for the Brooklyn Fire Department and was operated by the BFD until Brooklyn's fleet was merged with that of nearby New York City.

Her pumps could project 6,500 gallons per minute.

Upon arrival, she assisted the Seth Low in extinguishing the blaze.

On October 22, 1905, the David Boody helped fight a fire that broke out aboard the lighter Joseph Codringhams cargo of barrels of oil. While other fireboats fought the fire on the lighter itself, the David Boody fought the burning oil that had spilled onto the river.

She was retired in 1914, as a cost-saving measure.

See also
 Seth Low

References

Fireboats of New York City